Baró de Viver is a neighborhood in the Sant Andreu district of Barcelona, Catalonia (Spain).

Neighbourhoods of Barcelona
Sant Andreu